Ehud Havazelet (July 13, 1955 – November 5, 2015) was an American novelist and short story writer.

Ehud Havazelet was born in Jerusalem, Israel.  His father, Meir Havazelet, a rabbi and emeritus professor at Yeshiva University, emigrated to the United States in 1957. He graduated from Columbia University in 1977, and received an M.F.A at the University of Iowa Writers Workshop in 1984.  He was a Wallace Stegner Fellow and Jones Lecturer at Stanford University from 1984 to 1989. He taught creative writing at Oregon State University from 1989 to 1999. He began teaching at the University of Oregon in 1999 and held the position of Professor of Creative Writing at the time of his death in 2015.

Honors

 Pushcart Prize, 1988
 California Book Award, 1988
 Bay Area Book Reviewers Award, 1988
 Oregon Literary Arts Fellowship, 1990
 Oregon Literary Arts Fellowship, 1994
 Whiting Award, 1999
 Oregon Book Award for fiction, 1999
 Rockefeller Foundation Fellowship, 2000
 Guggenheim Fellowship, 2001
 Edward Lewis Wallant Award, 2007
Oregon Book Award for fiction, 2008
University of Oregon Fund for Faculty Excellence Award, 2008
 The Best American Short Stories, 2011

Works

Books
What Is It Then Between Us? (short stories), Scribner, 1988.
Like Never Before, (short stories), Farrar, Straus & Giroux, 1998.
Bearing the Body, (novel), Farrar, Straus & Giroux, 2007.

Anthologies
  
 (Originally published in TriQuarterly)

Short Stories

References

External links
Jewish Literary Review interview with Ehud Havazelet
Review of Bearing The Body on Jewish Literary Review
Podcast on Fogged Clarity with Ehud Havazelet discussing "Gurov in Manhattan"
Profile at The Whiting Foundation
 Obituary for Ehud Havazelet from the Corvallis Gazette-Times
Tribute to Ehud Havazelet on Oregonlive

1955 births
American short story writers
Jewish American writers
Columbia University alumni
Iowa Writers' Workshop alumni
Writers from Oregon
Stanford University Department of English faculty
Oregon State University faculty
University of Oregon faculty
Israeli emigrants to the United States
2015 deaths
People from Jerusalem
21st-century American Jews